The Maltese Super Cup is an annual super cup tie held in Malta between the champions of the previous Maltese Premier League season and the holders of the Maltese FA Trophy. In the event that the Premier League champion also won the FA Trophy, the league runners-up takes its place as the opposition. Up till 2003, the match used to be played at the end of the season, however this was altered to be played around mid-December.

The current holders are Hibernians, who defeated Floriana 5–4 on penalties after ending a 0-0 draw in the final played on 8 December 2022.

Results

Results by club

References

External links 
 List of Super Cup Finals on RSSSF

 
2